Walker is a city in Kent County in the U.S. state of Michigan.  The population was 23,537 at the 2010 census.  

Walker was originally organized as Walker Township in 1837 and later incorporated as a city in 1962. It is part of the Grand Rapids metropolitan area and is bordered by the city of Grand Rapids on the east.

History
The area was first organized as Walker Township on December 30, 1837, the second to be organized in Kent County. It initially comprised all of the land in the county north of the Grand River.  Shortly thereafter in 1838, part of the township was split off to form Ada Township. The earliest settlers of the township were Canadian immigrants.  In 1867, a township hall was built.  However, the area where the township hall was annexed into Grand Rapids in 1959.

Walker was established as a city in 1962 to prevent further annexation of the area into Grand Rapids.  At the time it was made a city, Walker had a population of 11,000.

The city gained national attention when Gwendolyn Graham and Cathy Wood committed their murders as workers at a nursing home in Walker in 1987.

Geography

Major highways
  runs along the north side of the city.
  passes briefly through the northeastern part of the city. 
  runs south–north through the western edge of the city.
  enters from the north of the city and then runs concurrently with I-96.
  runs west–east briefly through the center of the city.

Government
The city of Walker operates with a City commission government, with six elected officials serving on a commission plus an appointed city manager. The city government is represented by three wards, each with two elected commissioners, which are overseen by an elected mayor. 

The city levies an income tax of 1% on residents and 0.5% on nonresidents.

Economy
 The corporate headquarters for Meijer are located in the city of Walker.
 The headquarters for Bissell Homecare, Inc. is located in the city of Walker.
 A facility of the Grand Rapids Press is in Walker.

Media

Newspaper
 The Grand Rapids Press has its printing and distribution facility in Walker.

Television
 WZZM 13 is located in Walker.
 WXSP-CD 15 broadcast tower is located in Walker.

Radio
 WTRV 100.5 MHz is licensed to Walker. However, the studio is located in downtown Grand Rapids.

Education

Public schools
School districts serving the City of Walker include Comstock Park Public Schools, Grand Rapids Public Schools, Grandville Public Schools, and Kenowa Hills Public Schools.

Kenowa Hills schools in the Walker city limits include the Kenowa Hills Early Childhood Center/Day Care & Learning Center, (previously Walker Station Elementary School) Kenowa Hills Central Elementary School, (formerly Kenowa Hills Intermediate School) and Zinser Elementary School. The district previously operated Fairview Elementary School in Walker. Kenowa Hills district residents are zoned to Kenowa Hills Middle School and Kenowa Hills High School in Alpine Township.

One Grandville school, Cummings Elementary, is in the city limits.

One National Heritage Academies charter school, Walker Charter Academy, is in the city limits.

Private schools
Covenant Christian High School and Hope Protestant Reformed Christian School are located in Walker.

Public libraries
The Kent District Library Walker Branch is in Walker.

Sports
The DeltaPlex Arena is within Walker and was home to the Grand Rapids Gold of the NBA G League, which is an affiliate of the Denver Nuggets.

Demographics

2010 census
As of the census of 2010, there were 23,537 people, 9,684 households, and 5,923 families living in the city. The racial makeup of the city was 91.3% White, 2.8% African American, 0.5% Native American, 1.9% Asian, 1.4% from other races, and 2.1% from two or more races. Hispanic or Latino of any race were 4.1% of the population.

There were 9,684 households, of which 29.3% had children under the age of 18 living with them, 47.8% were married couples living together, 9.7% had a female householder with no husband present, 3.7% had a male householder with no wife present, and 38.8% were non-families. 30.5% of all households were made up of individuals, and 8.6% had someone living alone who was 65 years of age or older. The average household size was 2.40 and the average family size was 3.05.

The median age in the city was 34.6 years. 22.9% of residents were under the age of 18; 12.9% were between the ages of 18 and 24; 26.7% were from 25 to 44; 25.3% were from 45 to 64; and 12.1% were 65 years of age or older. The gender makeup of the city was 48.7% male and 51.3% female.

2000 census
As of the census of 2000, there were 21,842 people, 8,805 households, and 5,379 families living in the city. The racial makeup of the city was 94.51% White, 1.47% African American, 0.46% Native American, 0.98% Asian, 0.04% Pacific Islander, 1.09% from other races, and 1.45% from two or more races. Hispanic or Latino of any race were 2.75% of the population.

There were 8,805 households, out of which 30.9% had children under the age of 18 living with them, 50.0% were married couples living together, 7.9% had a female householder with no husband present, and 38.9% were non-families. 30.2% of all households were made up of individuals, and 7.1% had someone living alone who was 65 years of age or older.  The average household size was 2.45 and the average family size was 3.14.

In the city, the population was spread out, with 25.9% under the age of 18, 12.4% from 18 to 24, 32.1% from 25 to 44, 19.1% from 45 to 64, and 10.6% who were 65 years of age or older.  The median age was 32 years. For every 100 females, there were 97.7 males.  For every 100 females age 18 and over, there were 94.9 males.

The median income for a household in the city was $44,818, and the median income for a family was $58,912. Males had a median income of $37,438 versus $28,372 for females. The per capita income for the city was $21,198.  About 3.1% of families and 6.1% of the population were below the poverty line, including 4.0% of those under age 18 and 8.9% of those age 65 or over.

Sister city
 Walker is the sister city of Colac, Victoria in Australia.

Notes

References

External links
 City of Walker official website

Cities in Kent County, Michigan
Grand Rapids metropolitan area
1837 establishments in Michigan
Populated places established in 1837